Eurynora antepallida is a moth of the subfamily Arctiinae. It was described by Strand in 1922.

References

 Natural History Museum Lepidoptera generic names catalog

Lithosiini
Moths described in 1922